IMINT Image Intelligence AB, often called Imint AB, is a software company providing smartphone manufacturers with video analysis software under the trade mark Vidhance with headquarters in Uppsala, Sweden.

History
The company was founded in 2007 by Jakob Sandström (CTO) and Harald Klomp (CEO). In 2008, the private investment company Professionell Ägarstyrning i Sverige AB and Uppsala University holding company Uppsala Universitets Utvecklings AB invested in the company. Initially Imint focused on providing video analysis and optimizations to unmanned aerial systems.

On 6 April 2009, Imint was selected by Stockholm Innovation & Growth (STING) as one of the 26 hottest young technology companies in Sweden.

In 2010, the Swedish government venture capital firm Almi Invest joined as minority owners.

In 2012, Imint changed management, appointing Andreas Lifvendahl as CEO and Simon Mika as CTO. Under the new management Imint broadened to also include civil uses of unmanned aerial systems and even venturing into totally new markets.

In 2014, Vidhance Mobile was launched, initially featuring smartphone video stabilization. On 8 October 2014, Imint was awarded the Young Bulls Award  in a ceremony in Barcelona, Spain. They also won the Young Bulls Award the 2015.

In December the 2015, after a public funding round that was more than seven times oversubscribed the company was listed on the micro cap list Aktietorget. During the first three hours of trading the share increased its value by 250%.

Products 
At present, Imint has three main product categories on the market which each contains features for different stages of the video life-cycle. Besides the main features there are also Add-ons available for each product:
Vidhance Capture – Vidhance Video Stabilization, Vidhance Dynamic Motion Blur Reduction, Vidhance Noise Reduction, Vidhance Time Lapse, Variable Lens Distortion Correction, Focal Breathing Correction  
Vidhance Composition – Live Composer (previously known as Live Auto Zoom), Smoother Selfie Mode
Vidhance Post Process – Stabilization in post processing mode

Available subfeatures (Add-ons) 

 Vidhance Zoom
 Vidhance Live Tracker
Object Tracking
 Slow Motion
 Live Composer
OIS-compensation

Multi-platform support 
As announced by the company on 2 October 2018, Imint's camera- and video enhancing software now supports Android, Windows and Linux OS with version 3.0.

Customers

Aerospace and Defence 
Imint has in the past had several customers in the aerospace and defence industry. Among them are:
 Saab
 Kockums
 Elbit Systems
 BlueBird Aero
 Innocon

Smartphone manufacturers 
Today Imint's software is present in around 55 million android-based smartphones from several manufactures. The following have been confirmed through firmware analysis and/or other channels:
 Huawei
 Mate 9, Mate 9 Pro, Mate 9 Porsche
 P10, P10 Plus
 Honor 9
 P20, P20 Pro, P20 Porsche
 Honor View 10 (Through OTA-update)
 Honor 10 (Through OTA-update)
 Honor Play (Through OTA-update)
 Mate 20, Mate 20 Pro, Mate 20 Porsche, Mate 20 X
 BQ
 Aquaris X5 Plus
 Aquaris X, Aquaris X Pro
 Wiko
 Wim, Wim Lite
 View, View XL
 View Prime
 View 2
 View Pro
View 3 Pro
 Sharp
 Aquos R
 Aquos Sense
 Aquos R Compact
 Aquos R2
 Aquos Zero
 Vivo
 X20 
 X20 UD
 X21
 V11
 V11 Pro
 Z1
V15 Pro
 Xiaomi
 Redmi Note 5 Pro
 Mi Mix 2S
 Mi 6X
 Redmi S2/Y2
 Mi 8, Mi 8 Pro, Mi 8 Explorer, Mi 8 Youth Edition
 Redmi 6 Pro
 Mi A2
 Mi A2 lite
 Mi Mix 3
Mi 9 (With Motion Tracking based on Live Composer, previously known as Live Auto Zoom)
Mi 9 SE
 General Mobile
 GM 9 PRO
 Fujitsu Connected Technologies
 Arrows BE F-04K
 Oppo, OnePlus and Realme
 To be announced

Future markets

Medical, Surveillance, Action Cameras, Drones and IoT (Internet of Things) 
Besides Imint's current main market in the smartphone industry, the Imint team are also looking to apply their technology and expertise into new markets in the near future.
As of 14 November 2017. Imint announced a research collaboration with Swedish Kontigo Care and their advanced eHealth platform Previct®.

As stated on Imint's website, the company also got ambitions to enter markets for Surveillance, Action Cameras, Drones and IoT (Internet of Things)

Offices 
The company headquarters is based in Uppsala, Sweden, part of the Stockholm-Uppsala software technology corridor, a prominent software cluster.

Sales & support offices are also available in Shanghai, Singapore and Tokyo.

References

External links
 Company website
 Vidhance on Twitter
 Imint Image Intelligence on Linkedin
 Vidhance on Vimeo

Companies based in Uppsala County
Software companies of Sweden
Defence companies of Sweden
Mobile software
Software companies established in 2007
Swedish companies established in 2007
Uppsala